Flowers from Nice (German: Blumen aus Nizza) is a 1936 Austrian musical comedy film directed by Augusto Genina and starring Erna Sack, Friedl Czepa and Karl Schönböck. It was shot at the Rosenhügel Studios in Vienna and on location around Nice on the French Riviera. The film's sets were designed by art directors Emil Stepanek and Julius von Borsody. The film premiered in Vienna in September 1936. In 1939 it was screened in the United States.

The film is currently held at the Library of Congress.

Cast
 Erna Sack as Maria Castoldi  
 Friedl Czepa as Lisette  
 Karl Schönböck as Graf Ulrich von Traunstein 
 Paul Kemp as Rudi Hofer  
 Jane Tilden as Christl Niedermeyer  
 Hans Homma as Francois  
 Johanna Terwin as Frau Keller  
 Alfred Neugebauer as Chapelet  
 Anda Bori as Florence

References

Bibliography 
 Waldman, Harry. Nazi Films In America, 1933-1942. McFarland & Company, 2008.

External links 
 

1936 films
Austrian musical comedy films
Austrian black-and-white films
1936 musical comedy films
1930s German-language films
Films directed by Augusto Genina
Films set in Paris
Films set in Nice
Films shot in Nice
Films shot at Rosenhügel Studios